The cabinet of Vazgen Manukyan in Armenia was formed August 13, 1990.

Cabinet

Inaugural cabinet: 13 August 1990 – 22 November 1991

See also
Government of Armenia
Cabinet of Armenia

References

1990 establishments in Armenia
1991 disestablishments in Armenia
Cabinets established in 1990
Cabinets disestablished in 1991